Hippea alviniae is a thermoacidophilic and obligately anaerobic bacterium from the genus of Hippea which has been isolated from a hydrothermal vent from the East Pacific Rise.

References

 

Campylobacterota
Bacteria described in 2012